Elections were held in the Niagara Region of Ontario on October 25, 2010 in conjunction with municipal elections across the province.

Niagara Regional Council

Fort Erie

Grimsby

Lincoln

Niagara Falls

Niagara-on-the-Lake

Pelham

Port Colborne

St. Catharines

Mayor

Niagara Regional Council (6 elected)

Incumbents not running for re-election
 Judy Casselman 
 Peter Partington

St. Catharines City Council
2 candidates are elected in each ward.

Ward 1 - Merriton

Ward 2 - St. Andrew's

Ward 3 - St. George's

Ward 4 - St. Patrick's

Ward 5 - Grantham

Ward 6 - Port Dalhousie

Niagara Catholic District School Board

Trustee, Ward 1 Thorold/Merritton

Trustee, Ward 2-6 (2 Elected)

District School Board of Niagara (4 Elected)

Thorold

Wainfleet

Welland

West Lincoln

See also
St. Catharines Municipal Election Information Page

References

Municipal elections in St. Catharines
2010 Ontario municipal elections
Politics of the Regional Municipality of Niagara